is a passenger railway station located in the city of Yamato, Kanagawa, Japan and operated by the private railway operator Odakyu Electric Railway.

Lines
It lies 42.1 kilometers from the Shinjuku terminus.

Station layout
The station consists of two side platforms serving two tracks, which are connected to the station building by a footbridge.

Platforms

History
Sakuragaoka Station was opened on November 25, 1952. The station building was substantially modernized in 1978.

Passenger statistics
In fiscal 2019, the station was used by an average of 20,242 passengers daily.

The passenger figures for previous years are as shown below.

Surrounding area
Naval Air Facility Atsugi
Yamato City Hall Sakuragaoka Liaison Office
Hikichidai Park
Yamato Stadium (secondary name: Dokaben Stadium)

See also
 List of railway stations in Japan

References

External links

official home page.

Railway stations in Kanagawa Prefecture
Railway stations in Japan opened in 1952
Odakyū Enoshima Line
Railway stations in Yamato, Kanagawa